Lilias Ashworth Hallett (1844 – 1922) was a leading British suffragist. She organised, helped to fund activities and was a speaker. She was said to have been "made ill" by the militants but she conceded that it was the militants that created the progress that she had spent years failing to achieve.

Life
Ashworth was born in 1844 to Thomas and Sophia (born Bright) Ashworth. Her mother came from an influential Quaker family and her notable siblings included Margaret Bright Lucas, John Bright , Jacob Bright and Priscilla Bright McLaren. Ashworth was rich and had an income from her father's estate. At the time men had to have property to qualify for a vote. Ashworth joked that her property should enable her to have seven votes.

Ashworth was not merely a member of the Women's Social and Political Union but she organised celebrations at the Savoy Hotel when suffragettes were released from Holloway Prison. She was one of the WSPU backers. Starting in 1906 she gave over £160 towards their costs in 1907 and 1908. 

In 1867 she joined the London Society for Women's Suffrage. Her friends included Lydia Becker and Richard Pankhurst. She was a powerful speaker on the subject of gaining votes for women and she was compared to her uncle Jacob Bright.

She was invited by Mary Blathwayt and her parents to visit Eagle House in 1911. She had been there in 1908 to chair a meeting but this time she was invited to plant a tree. Like the Blathwayts she had mixed feelings about militancy within the suffrage movement. She was said to have been "made ill" by the militants but she confided that it was the militants that were creating the progress that she spent many years failing to achieve.

References

1844 births
1922 deaths
English suffragists
Eagle House suffragettes